Ernesto Alejandro Reyes Cruz (born 10 July 1991) is a Mexican professional footballer who plays as a defender.

References

External links
 
 

Living people
Liga MX players
Ascenso MX players
Inter Playa del Carmen players
Venados F.C. players
Atlante F.C. footballers
Toros Neza footballers
Mineros de Zacatecas players
1991 births
Footballers from Quintana Roo
Mexican footballers
Association football defenders